Thomas Uren  (28 May 1921 – 26 January 2015) was an Australian politician and Deputy Leader of the Australian Labor Party from 1975 to 1977. Uren served as the Member for Reid in the Australian House of Representatives from 1958 to 1990, being appointed Minister for Urban and Regional Development (1972–75), Minister for Territories and Local Government (1983–84) and Minister for Local Government and Administrative Services (1984–87). He helped establish the heritage and conservation movement in Australia and, in particular, worked to preserve the heritage of inner Sydney.

Early life
Uren was born in Balmain, Sydney, then a working-class suburb, and was educated at Manly High School. Uren's family is of Cornish ancestry, having originated in Penzance. Uren played rugby league for Manly Warringah in his youth and was a strong competitive swimmer. Uren had an early career as a professional boxer, and challenged for the Australian heavyweight championship against Billy Britt.

In 1941, Uren joined the Australian Army's permanent forces. He subsequently volunteered for the Second Australian Imperial Force and served in the 2/1st Heavy Battery. Uren was deployed to Timor and was a prisoner of the Japanese from 1942 to 1945, during which time he worked on the Burma Railway and served with Edward "Weary" Dunlop.

Uren was later transferred to Japan where he witnessed the distant crimson sky that resulted from the explosion of the US atom bomb on Nagasaki. He was discharged in December 1945 with the rank of Bombardier.

After the war Uren spent a short time trying to revive his boxing career which included a trip to England and Uren worked for his passage on voyages through the Panama Canal. On return, Uren worked as a Woolworths manager at Lithgow which led to being inspired to join the Australian Labor Party after attending Ben Chifley's funeral.

Uren and his wife Patricia moved to Guildford, in Sydney's west, in the late 1940s, and established two small retailing outlets on the corner of Chetwynd Road and Hawksview Street, West Guildford to gain the financial independence to pursue a political career. Uren also built a family home nearby, before transferring from the Lithgow branch of the Labor party to the West Guildford branch in 1954.

Political career

Uren won Labor pre-selection in 1957 for the House of Representatives seat of Reid in western Sydney, which he won at the 1958 election. He represented the electorate until his retirement before the 1990 election, thirty-two years later.

Uren was a strong supporter of the left wing of the Labor Party, led at first by Eddie Ward and later by Jim Cairns, and was sometimes accused of being a secret communist, an accusation he denied. He campaigned against the Vietnam War, conscription and nuclear testing.

In 1969 Uren was appointed by Gough Whitlam to the Opposition front bench with responsibility for housing and urban affairs, which became Uren's passion for the rest of Uren's career. Uren was Minister for Urban and Regional Development in the Whitlam government from 1972 to 1975. He established the Australian Heritage Commission and consequent compilation of the Register of the National Estate. In Sydney, Uren promoted the restoration and re-use of derelict inner city areas such as the Glebe Estate and Woolloomooloo, the reclamation of Duck Creek and the creation of the Chipping Norton Lakes Scheme.  He was a key player in the creation of the Towra Point Nature Reserve.  Despite his reputation as a firebrand, Uren proved a highly competent minister and was one of the few ministers to emerge from the fall of the Whitlam government with his reputation enhanced.

In 1976 Uren was elected Deputy Leader of the Labor Party under Whitlam as Opposition Leader, but after the 1977 election, when Bill Hayden was elected Leader, Uren was replaced by Lionel Bowen. Uren succeeded Jim Cairns as leader of the ALP Left, and bitterly opposed Bob Hawke's rise to the Labor leadership. As a result, when the Hawke government won the 1983 election, Uren, despite being a former deputy leader of the party, was omitted from the Cabinet – Uren was given the junior portfolio of Minister for Territories and Local Government, and from 1984 to 1987 Local Government and Administrative Services.  He became Father of the House of Representatives in 1984.

Uren stood down from the ministry after the 1987 election and retired from Parliament in 1990. He and Queensland's Clarrie Millar were the last combat veterans of World War II to serve in the House of Representatives, while Russ Gorman, a non-combat veteran, would serve until 1996. In retirement he continued to campaign for various causes, including the protection of Sydney Harbour and its foreshores. Uren opposed Australia's participation in the wars in Iraq and Afghanistan.

Honours

Uren was appointed an Officer of the Order of Australia (AO) in the 1993 Queen's Birthday Honours, awarded the Centenary Medal in 2001, and advanced to a Companion of the Order of Australia (AC) in the 2013 Australia Day Honours.

Legacy
There is now a park in Iris Street, West Guildford, called "Tom Uren Park" in memory of the Labor Party local.

Uren had a strong influence on Anthony Albanese, who became the Prime Minister of Australia in May 2022. Albanese stated in June 2021 that "I grew up without a dad, but not without a father. Tom Uren was my father figure."

Death
Uren died on 26 January 2015, aged 93.

Notes

References
 

1921 births
2015 deaths
1975 Australian constitutional crisis
Australian Labor Party members of the Parliament of Australia
Members of the Australian House of Representatives for Reid
Members of the Australian House of Representatives
Members of the Cabinet of Australia
Australian Army soldiers
Australian prisoners of war
Companions of the Order of Australia
Recipients of the Centenary Medal
Australian people of Cornish descent
World War II prisoners of war held by Japan
Burma Railway prisoners
20th-century Australian politicians
Australian memoirists
Australian Army personnel of World War II